J-Day may refer to:

 J Day, an annual rally held at different locations across the planet
 J-Day (military designation), used during both world wars to designate the day an assault occurred
 The day when the Tuborg Brewery releases their Christmas brew